Raziabad-e Bala (also Romanized as Raẕīābād-e Bālā and Raẕīābād Bālā; also known as Raẕīābād) is a village in Razakan Rural District, in the Central District of Shahriar County, Tehran Province, Iran. At the 2006 census, its population was 5,137, in 1,256 families.

References 

Populated places in Shahriar County